Rick Peters (born June 1, 1967 in Detroit, Michigan) is an American actor.  He has appeared in several films and numerous television shows, and is perhaps best known for his role as Australian Bobby Manning in Sue Thomas: F.B.Eye. He also plays the role of Elliot in the 4th season of Dexter.

Personal life
He resides in Southern California with his wife and two children.

Selected filmography

Film

Television

External links

1966 births
American male film actors
American male television actors
Living people
Male actors from Detroit